Zarn Sullivan (born 10 July 2000) is a New Zealand rugby union player, who currently plays as a fullback or fly-half for the  in Super Rugby and for  in New Zealand's domestic National Provincial Championship competition.

Early career

Sullivan was born in Napier in Hawke's Bay, where he attended Napier Boys' High School. While at Napier Boys', he played for the school's First XV team and represented Hawke's Bay at Under 14 and Under 16 level.

In 2017, he followed in his brother Bailyn Sullivan's footsteps and moved to Auckland where he spent his final two years of secondary school at King's College. He played for the college's First XV team in the Auckland 1A 1st XV competition. In 2017, an injury prevented him from being selected in the Auckland Under 18 squad, but a year later he was invited to attend the  Under 18 camp.

In 2019, Sullivan represented Auckland at Under 19 level at the Jock Hobbs Memorial National Under 19 tournament. That same year – his first year out of school – he was named the Auckland Rugby "Club Rookie of the Year" at the province's end-of-year awards function.

In 2019 and 2020, he played for both the Blues Under 20 and the Blues 'A' team.

Senior career

In September 2020, Sullivan was named in the  squad for the 2020 Mitre 10 Cup season. He made his debut for the province – via the bench – on 20 September 2020 against  and earned his first start on 17 October 2020 against .

His first, successful season playing for Auckland saw him rewarded with a spot in the  squad for the 2021 Super Rugby season. Having already played for the Blues during preseason ahead of the 2020 Super Rugby season, after being offered an Interim Training Contract, he made his Super Rugby debut for the franchise on 1 May 2021 against a  side that featured his brother Bailyn Sullivan. He scored a try on debut.

Sullivan went on to play 7 games for the Blues in his first season, which culminated in the franchise winning the Super Rugby Trans-Tasman title. While he played all his 1st XV rugby and age-grade representative rugby at first five-eighth, he played at fullback in all his senior games for Auckland and the Blues. He did this so well, that he was named the Blues "Rookie of the Year" at the end of the 2021 season.

In November 2021, Sullivan re-signed with the Blues until the end of the 2024 Super Rugby season.

International career

In 2018, after his last year at King's College, Sullivan was named in the New Zealand Secondary Schools team for a three-match international series in Australia. He played in all three games, including a 24–12 victory over Australian Schools.

A year later, Sullivan - who is of Ngāti Kahungunu descent - was selected to play for the first ever New Zealand Māori Under 20 team in a match against . The NZ Māori Under 20 team, which Sullivan co-captained, won the game 48 to 31.

Late 2019 and early 2020, Sullivan was invited to attend the New Zealand Under 20 trial and development camps in preparation of the 2020 Oceania Rugby Under 20 Championship and World Rugby U20 Championship. Unfortunately, Sullivan missed out on playing for the New Zealand Under 20 team, because these tournaments were cancelled due to the COVID-19 pandemic.

In June 2022, Sullivan and his brother Bailyn were – for the first time – named in the Māori All Blacks squad to take on Ireland on their New Zealand tour. He made his debut for the side on 29 June 2022, when the Māori All Blacks beat Ireland 32–17 in Hamilton. Sullivan, who for the first time played together with his brother, had a man-of-the-match performance and scored a try on debut.

Reference list

External links
NZ Rugby History profile
itsrugby.co.uk profile

2000 births
Living people
Ngāti Kahungunu people
People educated at Napier Boys' High School
People educated at King's College, Auckland
Rugby union players from Napier, New Zealand
New Zealand rugby union players
New Zealand Māori rugby union players
Rugby union fly-halves
Rugby union fullbacks
Auckland rugby union players
Blues (Super Rugby) players